Stadium Nueva Esparta, also known as Estadio Guatamare, is a stadium in Porlamar, Venezuela. It is primarily used as a baseball park, hosting the Bravos de Margarita's home games. It holds 18,000 people and was opened in 1956.

The ballpark hosted the Caribbean Series in 2010 and 2014.

Located in Guatamare, Porlamar, Margarita island.

References

Baseball venues in Venezuela
Buildings and structures in Nueva Esparta
Porlamar
1956 establishments in Venezuela